Dame Fiona Elizabeth Murray  is the Associate Dean for Innovation at the MIT Sloan School of Management. She is a member of the Prime Minister of the United Kingdom's Council for Science and Technology.

Early life and education 
Murray studied at Merton College, Oxford, where she earned her BA degree in 1989 and MA in 1990, both in Chemistry. She moved to the United States for her graduate studies, where she worked in applied science at Harvard University. For her research Murray studied decision making surrounding renewable energy policy in China. She obtained an AM degree in 1992 and a PhD in 1996 from Harvard, both in Applied Sciences. After completing her doctorate Murray returned to the University of Oxford, where she was appointed a lecturer at the Saïd Business School. She held a fellowship at St Catherine's College, Oxford.

Research and career 
Murray was appointed to the faculty at the MIT Sloan School of Management in 1999, where she serves as the William Porter Professor of Entrepreneurship. At MIT, Murray works on the commercialisation of scientific research and the development of mechanisms that can better connect academics to entrepreneurs. She specialises in biotechnology, biomedical science and clean energy. She helps scientific start-ups and spin-outs to develop their business strategy, partnering the public and private sectors. She teaches two courses at the MIT Sloan School of Management, including innovation teams and new enterprises, and launched the Martin Trust Center for MIT Entrepreneurship Entrepreneurship & Innovation degree in 2006. Her research considers the role of women in the commercialisation of science.

Murray is co-Director of the MIT Innovation Initiative. This role has seen her partner with communities in Africa, launching programs to support African entrepreneurs in their fundraising, networking and business proposals, as well as initiatives that champion diversity in innovation. She was elected to the Prime Minister of the United Kingdom's Council for Science and Technology in 2014. In 2015, she was made a Commander of the British Empire (CBE) in the New Year Honours for her services to entrepreneurship.

In 2020, Murray showed that women scientists are less likely to score highly on their grant applications because of the words that they use. Specifically, women are 16 % less likely to score highly on their grant proposals, which Murray attributes to different communication styles between men and women. She found that women use fewer of reviewer's favourite words, and more of the words that are associated with lower scores. She has studied the differences between men and women's patenting rates, as well as investigating where women inventors are located. Together with her first Ph.D. student at MIT, Kenneth G. Huang (National University of Singapore), they showed in 2009 that gene patents decrease follow-on public genetic knowledge, with broader patent scope, private sector ownership, patent thickets, fragmented patent ownership and gene's commercial relevance exacerbating their effect.

Murray was appointed Dame Commander of the Order of St Michael and St George (DCMG) in the 2023 New Year Honours for services to science, technology and diversity.

Selected publications

References 

Living people
Year of birth missing (living people)
Alumni of Merton College, Oxford
Harvard University alumni
Women innovators
Commanders of the Order of the British Empire
Dames Commander of the Order of St Michael and St George
MIT Sloan School of Management faculty
Saïd Business School